The 2010 HP Open (also known as the 2010 HP Japan Women's Open Tennis) was a women's tennis tournament played on outdoor hard courts. It was the 2nd edition of the HP Open, and was classified as one of the WTA International tournaments of the 2010 WTA Tour. It was played in Osaka, Japan from October 11 to October 17.

WTA players

Seeds

 Seeds are based on the rankings of October 4, 2010.

Other entrants
The following players received wildcards into the singles main draw:
  Ryōko Fuda
  Sachie Ishizu
  Aiko Nakamura

The following players received entry from the qualifying draw:
  Natalie Grandin
  Christina McHale
  Laura Robson
  Tomoko Yonemura

Champions

Singles

 Tamarine Tanasugarn def.  Kimiko Date-Krumm, 7–5, 6–7(4), 6–1
 It was Tanasugarn's 1st title of the year, and her 4th overall.
 It was the oldest known final ever, at a combined age of 73.

Doubles

 Chang Kai-chen /  Lilia Osterloh def.  Shuko Aoyama /  Rika Fujiwara, 6–0, 6–3

References

External links

 
HP Open
Hp Open
Hp Open